William Waltrude "Budge" Meldon (9 April 1879 – 23 May 1957) was an Irish cricketer. He was a right-handed batsman and a right-arm fast-medium bowler.

He started his cricket career playing county cricket with Warwickshire, for whom he played five first-class matches between 1909 and 1910. He then played three first-class matches for Ireland against Scotland between 1911 and 1914, which are his only games for Ireland. He also played minor counties cricket for Northumberland and Devon.

References
CricketEurope Stats Zone profile

1879 births
1957 deaths
Cricketers from Dublin (city)
Irish cricketers
Warwickshire cricketers
Northumberland cricketers
Devon cricketers